The Yekatit 12 is a monument in Addis Ababa commemorating victims of Italian reprisals following an attempt to kill the Marshal Rodolfo Graziani, marchese di Neghelli, Viceroy of Italian East Africa, on 19 February 1937, or Yekatit 12 in the Ethiopian calendar. It is located in the centre of Sidist Kilo (Amharic, "Six Kilometre") Square, also called  "Yekatit 12 square".

History 
During his visit to President of Yugoslavia Josip Broz Tito Emperor of Ethiopia Haile Selassie met Croatian sculptor Antun Augustinčić on the Brijuni islands. The Emperor invited Augustinčić to design a monument which will commemorate victims of Italian reprisals in Addis Ababa and stated "Who better than you will be able to portray the suffering of victims of fascism?". Augustinčić accepted the invitation and called his colleague Frano Kršinić with whom he designed the idea for the Monument to the Victims of Fascism. After he completed Yekatit 12 monument, Augustinčić constructed the Monument to the Ethiopian Partisan in Holeta and the Monument to Ras Mӓkonnen in Harar. To provide feedback and instruction for the Harar monument Afewerk Tekle went to Zagreb where he exchanged ideas with Augustinčić.

Despite being built during the monarchical period, the Yekatit 12 monument was not destroyed nor damaged after the 1974 military coup since it was not perceived as a glorification of the monarchy, but rather commemoration of the popular trauma.

See also 
 Ethiopia–Yugoslavia relations

References 

Squares in Addis Ababa
Obelisks in Ethiopia
Monument